Amira Casar is a British-born actress who grew up in England, Ireland, and France.

Early life
Amira is the daughter of a Kurdish father and a Russian mother. She was born in London and was subsequently raised in England, Ireland, and France. She studied drama at the Conservatoire National d'Art Dramatique de Paris between 1991 and 1994. She is fluent in both English and French and has worked in German, Italian, and Spanish.

Career
She played Sandra Benzakhem in the 1997 film La Vérité si je mens !, for which she was nominated for a César Award for Most Promising Actress. She later appeared in the film's two sequels, in 2001 and 2012.

Casar portrayed Myriem in How I Killed My Father (2001) by Anne Fontaine; Assia Wevill in Sylvia (2003) by Christine Jeffs; the lead role of The Woman in the Catherine Breillat erotic film Anatomy of Hell (2004); and Eva in To Paint or Make Love (2005) by Arnaud and Jean-Marie Larrieu, which was nominated for the Palme d'Or at the 2005 Cannes Film Festival.

In 2007, Casar appeared in installation artist Sophie Calle's Venice Biennale piece Prenez soin de vous (Take Care of Yourself).

In 2008, she played Dolorès in Laetitia Masson's , and portrayed Irene in Werner Schroeter's last film, Nuit de chien. Casar played the lead role of Anna Di Baggio in the  film   in 2009.

In 2013, she appeared in the Arnaud des Pallières film Michael Kohlhaas, and portrayed Anne-Marie Munoz in Bertrand Bonello's Saint Laurent in 2014.

In 2015, Casar appeared in The Forbidden Room by Canadian director Guy Maddin. and portrayed Béatrice, Madame de Clermont, in the TV series Versailles. In 2017, she played Annella Perlman in the film Call Me by Your Name. She also appeared in the 2019 Caroline Fourest film Sisters in Arms, about a team of female Kurdish soldiers and volunteers. 

In 2022, Casar appeared in the film The Contractor. She will next portray Edith Frank, the mother of Anne Frank, in the upcoming Disney+ series A Small Light.

On stage, Casar's work includes the Almeida Theatre production of Aunt Dan and Lemon; the title role in Hedda Gabler  at Le Petit Théâtre de Paris; and Olivier Py's 2009 production of Les Enfants de Saturne at the Theatre National de L'Odéon, Paris. In 2011, she appeared in the title role of Petra in The Bitter Tears of Petra von Kant, and received critical acclaim in Arthur Honegger's Jeanne d'Arc au bûcher at the Barbican Centre with the London Symphony Orchestra.

Casar also appeared in the 1995 Bryan Adams music video for "Have You Ever Really Loved a Woman?".

Filmography

Accolades 
 1998 – Nomination: César Award for Most Promising Actress for La Vérité si je mens !
 2016 – Chevalier of the Order of Arts and Letters

References

External links

 

Year of birth missing (living people)
Living people
Actresses from London
Irish emigrants to France
British people of Kurdish descent
British people of Russian descent
French people of Kurdish descent
French people of Russian descent
French film actresses
Irish film actresses
Irish female models
21st-century French actresses
20th-century French actresses
Cours Florent alumni
French National Academy of Dramatic Arts alumni
Chevaliers of the Ordre des Arts et des Lettres
20th-century English women
20th-century English people
21st-century English women
21st-century English people